John Kelsey may refer to:

 John Kelsey (American football), see 1974 NFL draft
 John Kelsey (artist), American art critic, writer and dealer
 John Kelsey (cricketer) (1867-1945), English cricketer
 John Kelsey (cryptanalyst), an American cryptanalyst